A reading series is a recurring public literary event featuring writers reading from their work to a live audience.  Some reading series are curated, some have themes, and some also feature music or other multimedia collaborations.  Others simply focus on the act of listening to the written word, read out loud.

Prominent reading series

Australia

Canada

British Columbia
 On Edge Reading Series.  Vancouver.
 The Robson Reading Series.  Vancouver.
 Short Line Reading Series, Vancouver

New Brunswick
 The Lorenzo Reading Series.  Saint John.

Ontario
 Harbourfront Centre Reading Series.  Toronto.
 Tree Reading Series. Ottawa.
 The Reading Series at St. Jerome's. Waterloo

Great Britain

England
 African Writers' Evening Reading Series.  London.

Scotland

Wales

Ireland
Riverbank Reading Series, Newbridge, Co. Kildare

United States

Arkansas
 Argenta Reading Series.  North Little Rock.
 Open Mouth Reading Series.  Fayetteville.

California
 Rhapsodomancy.  Los Angeles.
 Speakeasy Reading Series.  San Francisco.
 Opium Reading Series: Literary Death Match.  San Francisco.

Illinois
 Bookslut Reading Series. Chicago.
 The Danny's Reading Series.  Chicago.
 The Encyclopedia Show

Massachusetts
Literary Firsts: Aforementioned Productions. Cambridge.
The Tannery Reading Series: Newburyport.

Minnesota
 Rain Taxi Reading Series. Minneapolis.  Affiliated with the journal Rain Taxi.

Nebraska

New York
 Happy Ending Music and Reading Series.  New York City.
 Guerrilla Lit Reading Series.  New York City.
 Pete's Reading Series.  New York City.
 P.E.E.L. Series.  New York City.
 Opium Reading Series: Literary Death Match.  New York City

Louisiana
 1718 Reading Series. New Orleans.

Oregon
 If Not For Kidnap, Portland.
 Literary Arts - Poetry Downtown,  Portland.
 Loggernaut Reading Series,  Portland. 
 Spare Room,   Portland.
 Tangent Reading Series, Portland.
 Windfall Reading Series,  Eugene.

Pennsylvania
 UPWords, Pittsburgh.  Founding Curator, Damian Dressick.

Texas
 Zero-to-Sixty Reading Series.  Austin, Texas.

Washington
 It's About Time Reading Series.  Seattle.
 Subtext.  Seattle.

References

Social events
Literary societies